The Flajolet–Martin algorithm is an algorithm for approximating the number of distinct elements in a stream with a single pass and space-consumption logarithmic in the maximal number of possible distinct elements in the stream (the count-distinct problem). The algorithm was introduced by Philippe Flajolet and G. Nigel Martin in their 1984 article "Probabilistic Counting Algorithms for Data Base Applications". Later it has been refined in "LogLog counting of large cardinalities" by Marianne Durand and Philippe Flajolet, and "HyperLogLog: The analysis of a near-optimal cardinality estimation algorithm" by Philippe Flajolet et al.

In their 2010 article "An optimal algorithm for the distinct elements problem", Daniel M. Kane, Jelani Nelson and David P. Woodruff give an improved algorithm, which uses nearly optimal space and has optimal O(1) update and reporting times.

The algorithm
Assume that we are given a hash function  that maps input  to integers in the range , and where the outputs are sufficiently uniformly distributed. Note that the set of integers from 0 to  corresponds to the set of binary strings of length .

Note that with the above definition we are using 0-indexing for the positions, starting from the least significant bit.

Now the Flajolet–Martin algorithm for estimating the cardinality of a multiset  is as follows:
 Initialize a bit-vector BITMAP to be of length  and contain all 0s.
 For each element  in :
 Calculate the index .
 Set .
 Let  denote the smallest index  such that .

The idea is that if  is the number of distinct elements in the multiset , then  is accessed approximately  times,  is accessed approximately  times and so on. Consequently, if , then  is almost certainly 0, and if , then  is almost certainly 1. If , then  can be expected to be either 1 or 0.

The correction factor  is found by calculations, which can be found in the original article.

Improving accuracy
A problem with the Flajolet–Martin algorithm in the above form is that the results vary significantly. A common solution has been to run the algorithm multiple times with  different hash functions and combine the results from the different runs. One idea is to take the mean of the  results together from each hash function, obtaining a single estimate of the cardinality. The problem with this is that averaging is very susceptible to outliers (which are likely here). A different idea is to use the median, which is less prone to be influences by outliers. The problem with this is that the results can only take form , where  is integer. A common solution is to combine both the mean and the median: Create  hash functions and split them into  distinct groups (each of size ). Within each group use the mean for aggregating together the  results, and finally take the median of the  group estimates as the final estimate.

The 2007 HyperLogLog algorithm splits the multiset into subsets and estimates their cardinalities, then it uses the harmonic mean to combine them into an estimate for the original cardinality.

See also 
 Streaming algorithm
 HyperLogLog

References

Additional sources
 

Algorithms